Proto-Uto-Aztecan is the hypothetical common ancestor of the Uto-Aztecan languages. Authorities on the history of the language group have usually placed the Proto-Uto-Aztecan homeland in the border region between the United States and Mexico, namely the upland regions of Arizona and New Mexico and the adjacent areas of the Mexican states of Sonora and Chihuahua, roughly corresponding to the Sonoran Desert and the western part of the Chihuahuan Desert. It would have been spoken by Mesolithic foragers in Aridoamerica, about 5,000 years ago.

Homeland
Reconstructions of the botanical vocabulary offer clues to the ecological niche inhabited by the Proto-Uto-Aztecans. Fowler placed the center of Proto-Uto-Aztecan in Central Arizona with northern dialects extending into Nevada and the Mojave desert and southern dialects extending south through the Tepiman corridor into Mexico. The homeland of the Numic languages has been placed in Southern California near Death Valley, and the homeland of the proposed Southern Uto-Aztecan group has been placed on the coast of Sonora.

A contrary proposal suggests the homeland of Proto-Uto-Aztecan to have been much farther to the south; it was published in 2001 by Jane H. Hill, based on her reconstruction of maize-related vocabulary in Proto-Uto-Aztecan. By her theory, the assumed speakers of Proto-Uto-Aztecan were maize cultivators in Mesoamerica, who gradually moved north, bringing maize cultivation with them, during the period of roughly 4,500 to 3,000 years ago. The geographic diffusion of speakers corresponded to the breakup of linguistic unity. The hypothesis has been criticized on several grounds, and it is not generally accepted by Uto-Aztecanists.  Using computational phylogenetic methods, Wheeler & Whiteley (2014) also suggest a southern homeland for Proto-Uto-Aztecan in or near the area occupied by historical Cora and some Nahua. Nahuatl forms the most basal clade in Wheeler & Whiteley's (2014) Uto-Aztecan phylogram.  A survey of agriculture-related vocabulary by Merrill (2012) found that the agricultural vocabulary can be reconstructed for only Southern Uto-Aztecan. That supports a conclusion that the Proto-Uto-Aztecan speech community did not practice agriculture but adopted it only after entering Mesoamerica from the north.

A more recent proposal from 2014, by David L. Shaul, presents evidence suggesting contact between Proto-Uto-Aztecan and languages of central California, such as Esselen and the Yokutsan languages. That leads Shaul to suggest that Proto-Uto-Aztecan was spoken in California's Central Valley area, and it formed part of an ancient Californian linguistic area.

Phonology

Vowels
Proto-Uto-Aztecan is reconstructed as having an unusual vowel inventory: .

Consonants

Lexicon
The following are selected Proto-Uto-Aztecan reconstructions from Stubbs (2011).

Abbreviations
NUA = Northern Uto-Aztecan
SUA = Southern Uto-Aztecan

References

Sources

 

 

Uto-Aztecan languages
Uto-Aztecan